= Substance Abuse Disorders in Clinical Practice =

1983 book by Edward C. Senay

- Title page for Substance Abuse Disorders in Clinical Practice (1983)
- Author: Edward C. Senay.
- Published: 1983 (John Wright PSG); 1998 (W.W. Norton & Co.)
- ISBN: 9780723670247
- OCLC: 1070030053

Substance Abuse Disorders in Clinical Practice is a medical text written by Edward C. Senay. First published in 1983 by John Wright PSG, a second edition was published in 1998 by W.W. Norton & Co.
